Rhinanthus osiliensis, in English known by the common name Saaremaa yellow rattle,  is a flowering plant in the genus Rhinanthus in the family Orobanchaceae. It is endemic to the Estonian island Saaremaa in the Baltic Sea. Plants growing on the Swedish island Gotland have been ascribed to R. osiliensis, too, but genetic analyses have not supported this hypothesis.

Morphological features of R. osiliensis include glandular hairs on the sepals (calyx) and relatively narrow leaves. It is a late-flowering species of Rhinanthus, flowering from the end of July onwards.

It grows in wet meadows and spring fens. It is overall a rare species.

References

Parasitic plants
Rhinanthus minor
Rhinanthus minor
osiliensis